David James Redford (May 5, 1962 – October 16, 2020) was an American documentary filmmaker and environmentalist.

Early life
Redford was born in New York City, the son of historian Lola Van Wagenen and actor-director Robert Redford. He grew up in New York, but spent summers in the Provo Canyon area of Utah, where his family also had a home.

Redford received an undergraduate degree in creative writing and filmmaking from University of Colorado Boulder in 1985, and later received a master’s degree in English literature from Northwestern University.

In 1993, Redford underwent two liver transplants to combat the effects of primary sclerosing cholangitis.  His transplant experience led him to found the James Redford Institute for Transplant Awareness. Through the institute, he was the executive producer of his first documentary, The Kindness of Strangers in 1999, directed by Maro Chermayeff.

Career
In 2001, Redford was credited as the screenwriter for the western drama Cowboy Up as well as the 2002 television film Skinwalkers.  His directorial debut came in 2003 with the movie Spin, which he also screenwrote.

In 2005, he and his father Robert Redford co-founded the San Francisco based nonprofit called The Redford Center that produces films and helps filmmakers by providing them grant money.

Redford directed his first documentary, The Big Picture; Rethinking Dyslexia (2012), which was based on the challenges faced by his son Dylan in school. Interviewees in the documentary included Richard Branson, Charles Schwab, David Boies, and Gavin Newsom. Also in 2012 he produced Watershed.

His 2013 documentary Toxic Hot Seat dealt with the health problems caused by the use of flame-retardant materials used in furniture.

Other movies included Paper Tigers (2013)
, Resilience (2016)
, and Happening: A Clean Energy Revolution (2017). Cast members of Happening included Mark Ruffalo, Lisa Jackson, mayor Dale Ross and entrepreneur Emily Kirsch among others.

His most recent film Playing for Keeps premiered at the Mill Valley Film Festival in October 2020.

He was at work finishing a documentary on Amy Tan called Where The Past Begins.

Personal life
In 1988, Redford married Kyle Redford. They had two children.

Death 
Redford died from cancer of the bile ducts on October 16, 2020, at his home in Fairfax, California. He was 58 years old.

References

External links
 Redford Center Website
 op-ed by James Redford and Robert Redford
 KPJR Films co-founded by James Redford

1962 births
2020 deaths
Film directors from New York City
American environmentalists
American documentary filmmakers
American male screenwriters
Liver transplant recipients
Deaths from cancer in California